Plagiostoma is a genus of fungi in the family Gnomoniaceae. The genus contains 22 species.

References

External links
Plagiostoma at Index Fungorum

Gnomoniaceae
Sordariomycetes genera